Norman R. Morrison (December 29, 1933 – November 2, 1965) was an American anti-war activist best known for his act of self-immolation at age 31 to protest United States involvement in the Vietnam War. On November 2, 1965, Morrison doused himself in kerosene and set himself on fire below the office of Secretary of Defense Robert McNamara at the Pentagon. This action may have been taken after Thích Quảng Đức and other Buddhist monks, who burned themselves to death to protest the repression committed by the South Vietnam government of Catholic President Ngo Dinh Diem.

Background 
Morrison was born in Erie, Pennsylvania and was raised Presbyterian. At 13, his family moved to Chautauqua, New York, where Morrison joined the Boy Scouts of America and entered the God and Country Program, becoming the youngest BSA member in Chautauqua County to earn a God and Country award. Morrison graduated from the College of Wooster in 1956. He had gained an interest in the Quakers and their ideals, but continued to attend Presbyterian seminars in Pittsburgh and at the University of Edinburgh in Scotland. Morrison became a member of the Religious Society of Friends in 1959 and by 1965, he ran Stony Run Friends Meeting in Baltimore as its Executive Secretary. As an ardent believer in the principle of pacifism, he condemned the actions of the U.S. military in the Vietnam War. 

Six months before the act, on March 9, President Lyndon B. Johnson had authorized the use of napalm in the Vietnam War, which, by the end of the war, would end up killing at least 50,000 civilians in airstrikes. This decision had spurred fellow Quaker and peace activist Alice Herz to set herself on fire in an open street in Detroit, Michigan on March 26 of the same year, in similar vein as Thích Quảng Đức had done in 1963. At the time of his death, Morrison was married to Anne Welsh, also a Quaker, with whom he had two daughters and a son.

Death
Morrison took his daughter Emily, then one year of age, to the Pentagon, and either set her down or handed her off to someone in the crowd before setting himself ablaze. Morrison's reasons for taking Emily are not entirely known. However, Morrison's wife Anne later recalled, "Whether he thought of it that way or not, I think having Emily with him was a final and great comfort to Norman... [S]he was a powerful symbol of the children we were killing with our bombs and napalm – who didn't have parents to hold them in their arms."

In a letter he mailed to Welsh, Morrison reassured her of the faith in his act. "Know that I love thee ... but I must go to help the children of the priest's village". McNamara described Morrison's death as "a tragedy not only for his family but also for me and the country. It was an outcry against the killing that was destroying the lives of so many Vietnamese and American youth." He was survived by Anne Welsh and three children, Ben (who died of cancer in 1976), Christina and Emily.

Legacy 
Morrison was seen as devout and sincere in sacrificing himself for a cause greater than himself. In Vietnam, Morrison quickly became a folk hero to some, his name rendered as Mo Ri Xon. Five days after Morrison died, Vietnamese poet Tố Hữu wrote a poem, "Emily, My Child", assuming the voice of Morrison addressing his daughter Emily and telling her the reasons for his sacrifice.

One week after Morrison, Roger Allen LaPorte performed a similar act in New York City, in front of the United Nations building. On May 9, 1967, as part of the start to the 1967 Pentagon camp-in, demonstrators held a vigil for Morrison, before occupying the Pentagon for four days until being removed and arrested.

Morrison's widow, Anne, and the couple's two daughters visited Vietnam in 1999, where they met with Tố Hữu, the poet who had written the popular poem Emily, My Child. Anne Morrison Welsh recounts the visit and her husband's tragedy in her monograph, Fire of the Heart: Norman Morrison's Legacy In Vietnam And At Home.

On his visit to the United States in 2007, President of Vietnam Nguyễn Minh Triết visited a site on the Potomac near the place where Morrison immolated himself and read the poem by Tố Hữu to commemorate Morrison.

Cultural depictions
Filmmaker Errol Morris interviewed Secretary McNamara at length on camera in his documentary film, The Fog of War, in which McNamara says, "[Morrison] came to the Pentagon, doused himself with gasoline. Burned himself to death below my office ... his wife issued a very moving statement – 'human beings must stop killing other human beings' – and that's a belief that I shared, I shared it then, I believe it even more strongly today". McNamara then posits, "How much evil must we do in order to do good? We have certain ideals, certain responsibilities. Recognize that at times you will have to engage in evil, but minimize it."

Perhaps the most detailed treatment of Morrison's death appears in The Living and the Dead: Robert McNamara and Five Lives of a Lost War, by prizewinning author Paul Hendrickson, published in 1997.

Morrison's widow Anne Welsh appears, with her young children, in a segment of the French documentary, Far from Vietnam, in which she calmly describes the circumstances of her husband's death and expresses approval of his act. This footage is interspersed with an interview with a Vietnamese expatriate, Ann Uyen, living in Paris, who describes what Morrison's sacrifice meant to the Vietnamese people.

Morrison's immolation is portrayed in the HBO film Path to War, in which he is portrayed by Victor Slezak.

Morrison is the subject of a poem by Amy Clampitt called "The Dahlia Gardens" in her 1983 book The Kingfisher.

The incident inspired George Starbuck's poem Of Late.

A play by Canadian playwright Sean Devine, Re:Union, imagines a meeting between Morrison's daughter Emily and Robert McNamara. The play was published by Scirocco Drama in 2013.

Memorials
In the Vietnamese city of Đà Nẵng, a road is named after Norman Morrison in memory of his act against American involvement in South Vietnam. Parallel to it also is a road named after Francis Henry Loseby.

North Vietnam named a Hanoi street after him, and issued a postage stamp in his honor. Possession of the stamp was prohibited in the United States due to the U.S. embargo against North Vietnam.

See also
 Alice Herz
 Roger Allen LaPorte
 Florence Beaumont
 George Winne, Jr.
 Thích Quảng Đức
 Nhat Chi Mai
 Path to War

References

Further reading
 Welsh, Anne Morrison & Joyce Hollyday. Held in the light: One Man's Sacrifice for Peace and His Family's Search for Healing, Orbis (2008);

External links
 

1933 births
1965 deaths
1965 suicides
American anti–Vietnam War activists
American Quakers
American pacifists
People from Erie, Pennsylvania
Self-immolations in protest of the Vietnam War
Suicides in Virginia
Deaths from fire in the United States
20th-century Quakers
College of Wooster alumni